The 1964 DFB-Pokal Final decided the winner of the 1963–64 DFB-Pokal, the 21st season of Germany's knockout football cup competition. It was played on 13 June 1964 at the Neckarstadion in Stuttgart. 1860 Munich won the match 2–0 against Eintracht Frankfurt, to claim their 2nd cup title.

Route to the final
The DFB-Pokal began with 32 teams in a single-elimination knockout cup competition. There were a total of four rounds leading up to the final. Teams were drawn against each other, and the winner after 90 minutes would advance. If still tied, 30 minutes of extra time was played. If the score was still level, a replay would take place at the original away team's stadium. If still level after 90 minutes, 30 minutes of extra time was played. If the score was still level, a drawing of lots would decide who would advance to the next round.

Note: In all results below, the score of the finalist is given first (H: home; A: away).

Match

Details

References

External links
 Match report at kicker.de 
 Match report at WorldFootball.net
 Match report at Fussballdaten.de 

Eintracht Frankfurt matches
TSV 1860 Munich matches
1963–64 in German football cups
1964
Sports competitions in Stuttgart
20th century in Stuttgart
June 1964 sports events in Europe